Gliding Bird is the debut studio album by American country music singer-songwriter Emmylou Harris, released in 1969 on Jubilee Records (JGS-8031.)  Her first name was shown as two words ("Emmy Lou") on the jacket.

Before she met mentor Gram Parsons and became a famous country singer, Harris was singing folk music; yet Gliding Bird displays an eclecticism that is found in her later work. The album contains five folky Harris originals (with influences from Joan Baez. Judy Collins and Joni Mitchell) plus the country rock of Bob Dylan and Fred Neil, classic country of Hank Williams and a folk-pop rendition of a Dionne Warwick/Bacharach/David hit. Not until 1985's The Ballad of Sally Rose would another Harris album contain more than two of her own compositions.

Jubilee Records folded shortly after the release of this album, thus ceasing any distribution or promotion; its catalogue was purchased by Roulette Records. Neither of the singles released from the album made any of the Billboard Music Charts. The title song "Gliding Bird," was written by her then-husband, Tom Slocum. The album was later released on the Emus label as ES-12052, with a different cover.

Though technically Harris' first album, she subsequently disowned the record and regards 1975's Pieces of the Sky as her first "official" album.  However, in 2007 on the Songbird boxed set of rare material from Rhino Records, an alternate, slightly shorter take of the song "Clocks" from the Gliding Bird sessions finally saw the light of day.

Track listing

Personnel
Ray Ellis – producer, arrangements
Mickey Eichner – executive producer
Souren Mozian – recording engineer
The Graffiteria – cover design, photography

References

Emmylou Harris albums
1969 debut albums
Jubilee Records albums
Albums arranged by Ray Ellis
Albums produced by Ray Ellis